FC Eintracht Rheine is a German association football club from the city of Rheine, North Rhine-Westphalia.

History

The club was formed through the 10 June 1994 union of VfB Rheine and SG Eintracht Rheine. That merger actually shrouds a far more complex heritage that includes 18 individual predecessors dating back to 1907 on VfB's side and another 5 clubs going back to 1920 on SG's. Of these myriad ancestral clubs the best historical results were earned by SC Bourussia Rheine, founded in 1923, which played in the early rounds of the 1927–28 and 1930–31 national championship playoffs.

The current the club which resulted from the most recent merger took up play in the Verbandsliga Westfalen (V) and won promotion to the Oberliga Westfalen (IV) after taking the fifth division title in 1998. FCE has continued to play fourth tier football since then with their best result coming as a third-place finish in 2000–01. They went on to capture the Westfalenpokal (Westphalia Cup) in 2003 and gain entry to the first round of the German Cup where they were eliminated in the first round by then second division side VfB Lübeck by a score of 0:2 in extra time. During its stay in the Oberliga the team has generally earned mid-table results.

Since 2013 the club plays in the Oberliga Westfalen again after a stint in the Westfalenliga below.

Stadium
The club plays in the Auto-Senger-Stadion in Delsen (capacity 7,500) while the second team uses the Volksbank-Stadion in Uhlenhook.

Honours
The club's honours:
 Verbandsliga Westfalen (V)
 Champions: 1998
 Westphalia Cup
 Winners: 2003

External links
Official team site
Das deutsche Fußball-Archiv historical German domestic league tables 

Football clubs in Germany
Football clubs in North Rhine-Westphalia
Association football clubs established in 1994
1994 establishments in Germany